Drukgyel  Dzong was a fortress and Buddhist monastery, now  in ruins, located in the upper part of the Paro District, Bhutan. The dzong was probably built by Tenzin Drukdra in 1649 at the behest of Zhabdrung Ngawang Namgyal, to commemorate victory over an invasion from Tibet.

In the early 1950s, Drukgyel Dzong was almost completely destroyed by fire. It is listed as a tentative site on Bhutan's tentative list for UNESCO inclusion.

In 2016, to celebrate the birth of The Gyalsey, as well as to commemorate two other significant events, namely, the arrival of Zhabdrung Ngawang Namgyel to Bhutan in 1616 AD and the birth year of Guru Rinpoche, the Prime Minister Lyonchen Tshering Tobgay announced that the Dzong will be rebuilt and reinstated to its former glory. The announcement and ground breaking ceremony took place a day after the Prince was born.

References

Glory of Bhutan 

 Drukgyal Dzong
About Drukgyal Dzong

Dzongs in Bhutan
1649 establishments in Asia
Religious buildings and structures completed in 1649